Tapas Mandal is a member of the All India Trinamool Congress, elected in the 2014 Indian general elections from the Ranaghat (Lok Sabha constituency).

References

Living people
India MPs 2014–2019
Place of birth missing (living people)
People from Nadia district
Lok Sabha members from West Bengal
Year of birth missing (living people)